Humanoids from the Deep (released as Monster in Europe and Japan) is a 1980 American science fiction horror film starring Doug McClure, Ann Turkel, and Vic Morrow. Roger Corman served as the film's uncredited executive producer, and his company, New World Pictures, distributed it. Humanoids from the Deep was directed by Barbara Peeters and an uncredited Jimmy T. Murakami.

Plot

Anglers from the fishing village of Noyo, California, catch what appears to be a monster. The young son of one of the anglers falls into the water and something unseen drags him under the surface. Another angler prepares a flare gun, but he slips and accidentally fires it into the deck, which is soaked with gasoline dropped earlier by the boy. The vessel bursts into flames and explodes; everybody aboard is killed. Jim Hill (McClure) and his wife Carol witness the explosion. Later, Jim and Carol's dog goes missing and the pair finds its dismembered corpse on the nearby beach.

The following day, teenagers Jerry Potter (Meegan King) and Peggy Larson (Lynn Schiller) go for a swim at the beach. Jerry is abruptly pulled under the water. Peggy believes it is a prank until she discovers his mutilated corpse. Peggy screams and tries to reach the beach, but a monstrous figure drags her across the sand. The humanoid creature tears off her bikini and rapes her.

That night, two more teenagers are camping on the same beach. Billy (David Strassman) is about to have sex with his girlfriend, Becky (Lisa Glaser) when another humanoid monster claws its way inside, kills him, and chases Becky onto the beach. She outruns her assailant, but then runs into the arms of yet another monster, which throws her to the sand and rapes her. More attacks follow; not all of them successful, but few witnesses survive to tell the public about the incidents; only Peggy is found alive, though severely traumatized. Jim's brother is also attacked, prompting Jim to take a personal interest in the matter.

A company called Canco has announced plans to build a huge cannery near Noyo. The murderous, sex-hungry mutations are apparently the result of Canco's experiments with a growth hormone they had earlier administered to salmon. The salmon escaped from Canco's laboratory into the ocean during a storm and were eaten by large fish that then mutated into the brutal, depraved humanoids that have begun to terrorize the village.

By the time Jim and Canco scientist Dr. Susan Drake (Turkel) have deduced what is occurring, the village's annual festival has begun. At the festival, many humanoids appear, murdering the men and raping every woman they can grab. Jim devises a plan to stop the humanoids by pumping gasoline into the bay and setting it on fire, cutting off the humanoids' way of retreat. Meanwhile, Carol is attacked at home by two of the creatures, but manages to kill them before Jim arrives.

The morning after the festival, normality seems to have returned to the village. Jim asks the sheriff about Dr. Drake. The sheriff mumbles that she went back to the lab, where she is coaching a pregnant Peggy, who has survived her sexual assault. Peggy is about to give birth when her monstrous offspring bursts from her womb, with Peggy screaming at the screeching baby.

Cast

Production
Humanoids from the Deep was originally offered to Joe Dante, who turned it down. Peeters accepted the film, and shooting commenced in October 1979. Executive producer Corman said Peeters' version of the film lacked the required exploitative elements needed to satisfy its intended audience. In an interview included on the 2010 Blu-ray release by Shout! Factory, Corman stated Peeters and he had discussed his expectations of the film regarding B-movie exploitation – this being to fulfill Corman's maxim that monsters "kill all the men and rape all the women". In postproduction, Corman said Peeters had done an outstanding job in filming the death scenes involving male characters, but all of the rape scenes had been left "shadowy" or used cutaways before the attacks occurred. Portions of the film were directed by an uncredited Murakami, who directed the Corman-produced sci-fi cult classic Battle Beyond the Stars the same year.

The film's budget was $2.5 million. The monster costumes were designed and created by Rob Bottin.

Second unit director James Sbardellati, who later directed Deathstalker, was hired to enliven the film; he filmed explicit scenes in which the humanoids rape women. These changes were not communicated to most of the people who had made the film with the working title Beneath the Darkness; several of them expressed shock and anger at the released film, its changed title, and the nudity and sexual exploitation. After Peeters and Turkel saw the additional sequences, they asked for their names to be removed from the film, but were refused. Turkel appeared on television talk shows and castigated Corman for his actions.

Primary filming took place in the California towns of Mendocino, Fort Bragg, and Noyo.

Soundtrack
The score of the film was the second to be composed by James Horner.

Reception

Humanoids from the Deep is a 1980s updating of similarly plotted genre films made in the 1950s and 1960s Del Tenney's The Horror of Party Beach (1964) in particularwith the addition of graphic violence and nudity. The film was a modest financial success for New World Pictures.

Critical reviews were mostly negative. Paul Taylor said in Time Out, "Despite the sex of the director, a more blatant endorsement of exploitation cinema's current anti-women slant would be hard to find; Peeters also lies on the gore pretty thick amid the usual visceral drive-in hooks and rip-offs from genre hits; and with the humor of an offering like Piranha entirely absent, this turns out to be a nasty piece of work all round".

Briefly discussing the film in Fangoria, Alien writer Dan O'Bannon criticized the film, saying, "Roger Corman's people ripped off the chestburster idea for Humanoids of the Deep."

Phil Hardy's The Aurum Film Encyclopedia: Horror stated that additional sex and violence scenes had been edited into the film without director Peeter's knowledge. Hardy continued, "As weighed down as it is with solemn musings about ecology and dispossessed Indians, it looks as if it had always been a hopeless case".

Nathaniel Thompson said on his Mondo Digital website, "Director Peeters claimed that Roger Corman added some of the more explicit shots of slimy nudity at the last minute to give the film some extra kick, but frankly, the movie needed it. Though competently handled, the lack of visual style, occasionally slow pacing, and peculiar lack of (intentional) humor hinder this from becoming an all-out trash masterpiece".

In his Psychotronic Encyclopedia of Film, Michael Weldon said, "Many were offended by the rape aspect of this fast-paced thriller featuring lots of Creature from the Black Lagoon-inspired monsters. Like it or not, it was a hit and is not dull".

Author and film critic Leonard Maltin gave the film 3 out of a possible 4 stars, calling it "fast, occasionally hilarious gutter trash from the Roger Corman stable".

On Rotten Tomatoes, the film has a 50% based on 10 reviews, with an average rating of 5.17 out of 10.

Remake
In 1996, a remake of Humanoids from the Deep was produced for Showtime by Corman's production company, Concorde-New Horizons. It starred Robert Carradine, Emma Samms, Justin Walker, Mark Rolston, Danielle Weeks and Clint Howard. It was released on DVD on August 26, 2003.

Home media
On August 3, 2010, Shout! Factory released a 30th Anniversary Special Edition DVD and Blu-ray of the film. It contained a new anamorphic widescreen transfer of the film, as well as interviews and a collectible booklet. In this edition, the film's actual on-screen title is Monster, and thus it contains the uncut European version.

References

Notes

External links
 
 
  (Remake)

1980 films
1980 horror films
1980s monster movies
1980s science fiction horror films
American exploitation films
American monster movies
American natural horror films
American science fiction horror films
1980s English-language films
Films about fish
Films scored by James Horner
Films set in California
New World Pictures films
Films about rape
Films about genetic engineering
Films shot in California
Films directed by Barbara Peeters
1980s American films